Saripidem is a sedative and anxiolytic drug in the imidazopyridine family, which is related to the better known drugs zolpidem and alpidem. 

Saripidem has a similar pharmacological profile to the benzodiazepine family of drugs including sedative and anxiolytic properties, but its chemical structure is quite different from that of the benzodiazepine drugs, and saripidem is described as a nonbenzodiazepine. 

The mechanism of action by which saripidem produces its sedative and anxiolytic effects is by modulating the benzodiazepine binding site on GABAA receptors, however unlike many older GABAA agonists, saripidem is highly subtype selective and binds primarily to the ω1 subtype.

References 

Carboxamides
Chloroarenes
GABAA receptor positive allosteric modulators
Imidazopyridines
Sedatives